Susac Crni is a native red wine grape in the Kvarner region of Croatia.  Typically rare in single bottling, it is often blended with other grapes.

Synonyms
As per island dialects, this wine has a number of synonyms including but not limited to: Brajda Velika, Bašćanac, Paškinja, Sansigot, Sujćan, Tvardo Grozje, Sanseg, and Sušćan Crni.

References

Grape varieties of Croatia
Red wine grape varieties